The Anglican Diocese of Newcastle in Australia is a diocese of the Anglican Church of Australia. The diocese is located in the state of New South Wales. It is centred in the city of Newcastle and extends along the state's coast from Woy Woy to Laurieton and inland to Merriwa and Murrurundi.

The diocese was founded from the Diocese of Australia by letters patent of 25 June 1847. The cathedral church of the diocese is Christ Church Cathedral in Newcastle.

The diocesan bishop is the Bishop of Newcastle. On 25 November 2017, Peter Stuart, the assistant bishop at the time, was elected as the diocesan bishop. He was installed at Christ Church Cathedral on 2 February 2018.

Bishops

Assistant bishops

Robert Davies was assistant bishop in 1963 and became Bishop of Tasmania. Leslie Stibbard was appointed an assistant bishop in 1964, serving for ten years. Geoffrey Parker served 1974–1982 and died on 28 February 1997. Richard Appleby served 1983–1992 and became diocesan Bishop of the Northern Territory.

Graeme Rutherford (Graeme Stanley Rutherford) was consecrated a bishop on 4 November 2000 and served as assistant bishop for the Central Coast.

Peter Stuart was assistant bishop from 2009 until his 2018 election to the diocesan See, during which time he twice administered the diocese.

On 10 May 2018, Stuart consecrated Sonia Roulston and Charlie Murry as assistant bishops for the Inland and the Coast respectively.

See also
Newcastle School of Theology for Ministry

References

External links
Diocese of Newcastle website
Churches of the Diocese of Newcastle
Anglican Diocese of Newcastle history